The Western Music Association Hall of Fame is sponsored by the Western Music Association. Inductees are those individuals deemed important to the traditional and contemporary music of the American West and the American Cowboy. The organization is headquartered in Coppell, Texas.

Inductees

1989-1999

1989
Rex Allen
Gene Autry
Patsy Montana
Tex Ritter
Marty Robbins
Roy Rogers
Dale Evans
Sons of the Pioneers

1990
Eddie Dean
Cindy Walker
Johnny Bond
Elton Britt

1991
Wilf Carter
Andy Parker and The Plainsmen
Jimmy Wakely
Foy Willing and The Riders of the Purple Sage

1992
None

1993
Rosalie Allen
Riders in the Sky
Hi Busse and The Frontiersmen

1994
Bob Nolan
Tim Spencer

1995
Bob Wills and The Texas Playboys

1996
Ray Whitley
Cass County Boys

1997
Herb Jeffries
Stan Jones
Wesley Tuttle

1998
Billy Beeman
Smiley Burnett
The Reinsmen

1999
Stuart Hamblen
Billy Hill
Jim Bob Tinsley

2000-2009
2000
Slim Clark
The Beverly Hillbillies
Frankie Laine

2001
Johnny Western
Carolina Cotton
Monte Hale
Carson Robison

2002
None

2003
None

2004
Rusty Richards
Dimitri Tiomkin
The Jimmy Wakely Trio
Michael Martin Murphey

2005
Ken Maynard
John M. "Jack" Elliott
Don Edwards
Red Steagall

2006
Carl T. Sprague
Sons of the San Joaquin

2007
Fleming Allan
Rex Allen Jr.

2008
Bing Crosby
Tommy Doss
Lloyd Perryman
Dale Warren
Ian Tyson

2009
John Lomax
Rich O'Brien
Flying W Wranglers

2010-2019

2010

Frankie Marvin
John A. Lomax

2011

 R.W. Hampton
 Vaughn Monroe

2012
Ken and Nora Griffis

2013

 Johnny Cash
 Louise Massey & The Westerners
 Jimmy Kennedy & Michael Carr

2014

 Glenn Spencer
 The Farr Brothers
 Joey Miskulin

2015

 Bob Atcher
 Chris LeDoux

2016

 Pat Brady
 Dave Stamey

2017

 Eddy Arnold
 Slim Dusty
 Johnny Marvin 
 Fred Rose

2018

 Girls of the Golden West
 Robert Wagoner

2019
Lynn Anderson
Cowboy Joe Babcock

See also
 List of music museums

References

External links
Official Site

Culture of the Western United States
Music halls of fame
Cowboy halls of fame
Music W
Western music (North America)